Louis-Joseph Le Lorrain (Paris, 1715- 1760) was a French painter and engraver.

He studied design and engraving with Jacques Dumont.  He then moved to Rome, becoming known in artistic circles before returning to Paris to join the Academy. He spent some years in St Petersburg, Russia, where he died. He painted devotional canvases with vigorous touch. He engraved with acquaforte some of his own compositions. He also engraved the following paintings by Jean-Francois de Troy: the Judgement of Solomon, Solomon sacrifices to the idols of his concubine, Esther and Assuerus, and Death of Cleopatra. Among his disciples was Fyodor Rokotov.

His son, Jean-Baptiste Le Lorrain, was an engraver. He was born in Paris in 1737. Apprenticed to his father, his prints include: Chauville in tragedy of Calas by De Lorme; Venus at Judgement of Paris, by Boucher; the Tranquil Wave by Vernet; Homage to Love by Van Loo; and seven scenes of the Life of St Gregory .

References

External links
 

1715 births
1760 deaths
Painters from Paris
18th-century engravers
French engravers
18th-century French painters
French male painters
18th-century French male artists